Uduk, also known as Twʼampa (Tʼwampa), is a Koman language spoken in Sudan near the border with Ethiopia.  Nearly the entire population fled to a refugee camp in Ethiopia during the Second Sudanese Civil War, but returned to Sudan once fighting stopped. The resurgence of hostilities in the Blue Nile province after 2011 once more resulted in the Uduk community to enter refugee camps in Ethiopia and South Sudan.

Phonology

Consonants

 Consonants in parentheses are allophones.
 Consonants in brackets are rare or marginal.

Vowels

References

 Don Killian (2015) "Topics in Uduk Phonology and Morphosyntax" Ph.D. thesis. University of Helsinki.
 Don Killian and Harald Hammarström (2010) "Notes on the morphosyntax of Uduk"
 Bender, M. L. 1983. Proto-Koman phonology and lexicon. Afrika und Übersee 66, 259–297.

Languages of Ethiopia
Languages of Sudan
Koman languages